Hochdeutsch is a German word which literally translates to "High German" and may refer to:

 High German languages or High German dialects (hochdeutsche Mundarten)
 Standard German, the standardized variety of the German language, which encompasses:
 Österreichisches Hochdeutsch or Austrian High German
 Schweizer Hochdeutsch or Swiss Standard German